Unilever Italia SpA v Central Food (2000) C-443/98 is an EU law case, concerning the conflict of law between a national legal system and European Union law.

Facts
Unilever sold olive oil to Central Food, which refused to pay on the ground the oil did not comply with Italian law. This was a ‘technical regulation’ under Directive 83/189. Unilever claimed damages for breach of contract. The question was referred to the European Court of Justice, whether the Directive precluded enforcement of the contract.

Judgment
The European Court of Justice upheld Unilever's claim that the law could not be applied. The Directive was a procedural bar to adopting national legislation.

See also

European Union law

Notes

European Union food law
Italian case law